The Ministry of Defence (or MDD) is the government body of the Italian Republic responsible for military and civil defence matters and managing the Italian Armed Forces. It is led by the Italian Minister of Defence, a position occupied by Guido Crosetto since October 2022.

Initially created as Ministry of War, it was later renamed as Ministry of Defence, merging also the pre-existent Ministries of Navy and Air Force, after the end of World War II with the De Gasperi III Cabinet.

The first Minister of defence was Luigi Gasparotto, succeeded to Cipriano Facchinetti, last Minister of war.

History 
The precursors of the Ministry of Defence were the Ministry of War and the Ministry of the Navy, among the first ministries created in the Kingdom of Sardinia. With the Italian unification, during the Cavour IV Cabinet, the division of the two Ministries remained, similar to the other European government bodies. On 30 August 1925 the Mussolini Cabinet established the Ministry of Air Force as the third military ministry, completing the creation of Italian Armed Forces. The Ministry of Air Force was managed almost without interruptions by Mussolini himself from its creation to the fall of Fascism in 1943, excluding in the period between 1929 and 1933 during which it was ruled by Italo Balbo. In the Italian Social Republic the Ministry of National Defence was created.

The Decree of the Temporary Head of State n. 17 of 4 February 1947, issued during the De Gasperi III Cabinet, established the merger into the Ministry of Defence of former Ministries of War, Navy and Air Force that, autonomously and with their own regulations, had presided to organization tasks of state military defence until then. Provisions which led to the actual unification of the Ministry had been the law n. 1862 of 12 December 1962 and law n. 1058 of 2 October 1964, with which that delegation was renewed and extended by civil personnel in order to conform to needs derived from the organization of central and peripheral services offices, as well as of factories and military arsenals.

Task and functions 

The Minister has the task of overseeing the coordination of Italian defence and he/she is in charge to report to the Parliament about the military implications of Italy, the redistribution of military expenditure and the implementation state of national defensive programmes.

This activity has to be coordinated with those of the President of the Italian Republic, who presides the Supreme Council of Defence and commands the Italian Armed Forces, where the Minister is a mere competent. Minister of Defence, in relation with military magistrates and the Council of Military Judiciary, has the same function of the Italian Minister of Justice within the High Council of the Judiciary (CSM).

The Minister is also the chancellor and treasurer of the Military Order of Italy.

Organization 
The Ministry of Defence has been re-organized with the Decree of the President of Republic n. 145 of 3 August 2009 in offices in direct collaboration with the Minister, 9 general directions for the technical-administrative field and commands for the technical-operative field. The structure of the General Secretariat, general directions and central offices of the Ministry of Defence is regulated by Ministerial decree of 16 January 2013.

Cabinet office 
The cabinet office of the Ministry is formed as follows:

 Secretary of the Minister;
 Cabinet office of the Minister;
 Legislative office of the Minister;
 Office of military policy of the Minister;
 Office of diplomatic advisor of the Minister;
 Internal control service of the Ministry of Defence;
 Public information service of the Minister;
 Secretaries of State undersecretaries;
 Spokesperson of the Minister;
 Legal advisor of the Minister;
 Political advisor of the Minister.

Technical-administrative area 
The technical-administrative area is organized in 4 general directions and 5 technical directions:

 General Direction for Military Personnel (telegraphic abbreviation: PERSOMIL);
 General Direction for Civil Personnel (PERSOCIV);
 General Direction of Military Social Security and Conscription (PREVIMIL);
 General Direction of Commissariat and General Services (COMMISERVIZI);
 Field Weaponry Direction (TERRARM);
 Naval Weaponry Direction (NAVARM);
 Air Force Weaponry Direction (ARMAEREO);
 IT, Telematic and Advanced Technologies Direction (TELEDIFE);
 Direction of Works and State Property (GENIODIFE);

This field depends directly to the General Secretary and National Director of Weaponry, who in turn depend by the Defence Chief of Staff only for technical-operative aspects.

Technical-operative Area 
The operative-military structure of the Ministry is organized as follows:

 Chief of Defence Geneal Staff (CSMD);
 Italian Joint Operations Headquarters ( JOHQ - COI);
 Centre for Defense Higher Studies (CASD);
 Joint Special Forces Operations Headquarters (COFS);
 Interforce military entities
 Italian Joint Air Operations School
 Joint School of CBRN Defence
 Armed Forces Institute of Telecommunications

The Defence General Staff (Stato maggiore della Difesa) depends directly to the Minister, with the Chief of Defence at the top who controls the Chiefs of Staff of the Armed Forces and, limited to the technical-operative attributions, the General Secretary of Defence. The Chief of Defence is responsible for the planning, predisposition and use of armed forces in their entirety, and for these activities he is supported by a Staff and a Command of Joint Operations (COI).

Consultative bodies and personnel
The consultative and support bodies of the Minister of Defence are the followings:

 Central Office of Budget and Financial Affairs (BILANDIFE);
 Central Office for Administrative Inspections (ISPEDIFE);
 General Commissariat for Honors to Fallen of War (ONORCADUTI), articulated in territory with seven directions:
 Direction of Asiago War Memorial (Trentino-Alto Adige and West Veneto)
 Direction of Mount Grappa War Memorial (East Veneto)
 Direction of Redipuglia War Memorial (Friuli Venezia Giulia)
 Direction of War Memorial of Rome-Fosse Ardeatine
 Direction of Mignano-Montelungo War Memorial
 Direction of War Memorial of the Fallen Overseas in Bari (Southern Italy)
 Direction of El Alamein Italian War Memorial
Military Ordinariate of Italy.

Chief of Defence General Staff 

The Italian Chief of Defence General Staff is appointed with a decree of the President of the Republic, on proposal of the Minister of Defence. He has to be and officer of the Army, Navy or Air Force with the rank of generale di corpo d'armata, ammiraglio di squadra or generale di squadra aerea in standing service. He depends directly to the Minister of Defence, of who he is also the higher technical-military advisor and to who he responds for the actuation of directives received.

The Chief of Staff of the Armed Forces, reunited in the committee of Chiefs of Staff, are hierarchically subordinated to the CSMD, who joins also the Supreme Council of Defence and he is replaced by the oldest in office among the Chiefs of Staff of the Armed Forces.

General Secretary and National Director of Weaponry 
The General Secretary of Defence is also the National Director of Weaponry, to whom the National Direction of Weaponry (within the General Secretariat of Defence) is subordinated. This charge was established in 1965 and it has been altered several times. During the 1990s, the law n. 25 of 1997 made it more agile, efficient and appropriate to new needs.

The General Secretary directly responds to the Minister of Defence for administrative competences and to the CSMD for the technical-operative ones, and he controls 9 general direction of the Ministry. Main tasks of the General Secretary of Defence are related to the actuation of directives issued by the Minister in the field of higher administration, to the operation of technical-administrative field of defence, to the promotion and coordination of technological research relative to weaponry materials. The General Secretary manages the supplying of means, materials and weapon systems for the Armed Forces, the support to the Italian defence industry and direct/indirect offsets.

Centre for Defence Higher Studies 
The Centro Alti Studi per la Difesa ("Centre for Defence Higher Studies", CASD) is the highest organization of studies and training in the field of security and defence. CASD has the purpose to improve knowledges and skills of higher officials and civil defence officers, refine professional training and cultural formation of officers among interforces and to elaborate studies regarding the organization of national defence and military preparation.

The president of the CASD is responsible for the higher studies in the field of security and defence as well as for the training of the relative managers. He is assisted by a Staff for general support and the coordination of activities common to four independent bodies of CASD: Istituto alti studi per la difesa ("Italian Defense Higher Studies Institute", IASD), Istituto superiore di stato maggiore interforze ("Joint Services Staff College", ISSMI), Centro militare di studi strategici ("Military Centre for Strategic Studies", CeMiSS) and Centro per la Formazione Logistica Interforze ("Joint Logistics Education Centre", Ce. FLI). The president is directly subordinated to the Chief of Staff and is assisted by a Directive Council he presides over, formed by IASD military and civilian Adjuvant Directors, the ISSMI Director, the CeMiSS Director acting as secretary, the CeFLI Direction and the Chief of Defence.

The Directive Council examines and expresses its opinions on study programs of the two formation institutes, on activities of sessions and courses, on the evaluation system of Attending Officers and on all the organizational and functional aspects of CASD, aimed at increasing the maximum level of synergy in the use of the available human, material and financial resources.

Military Justice 
According to the Italian Constitution, military courts have the jurisdiction established by law during wartimes while they judge only over military crimes committed by members of the Armed Forces. The relationship between the Minister of Defence, military magistrates and the Council of Military Judiciary is similar to the one between the Minister of Justice, High Council of the Judiciary and ordinary magistrates.

Disciplinary proceeding involving military magistrates is regulated by laws for ordinary magistrates. The military general prosecutor at the Court of Cassation exercise the function of the Public Minister and does not take part to deliberations.

Council of Military Judiciary

The Consiglio della magistratura militare ("Council of Military Judiciary", CMM) is an autonomous body with competences specular to the ordinary ones belonging to the CSM. It was established with law n. 561 of 30 December 1988 and it provides to assumptions, assignations, transfers, promotions, disciplinary proceeding and to every aspect involving the juridical status of military magistrates. CMM is responsible also of the provision of extrajudicial charges and it is competent on every other subject according by law.

Overseen entities and controlled companies 
According to law, the Ministry oversees various public and private entities

Public entities 
The public entities overseen and funded by the Ministry are:

 Agenzia industrie difesa, which manages the productive assets of defence;
 Cassa di previdenza delle forze armate, a social security entity for militars;
 Opera nazionale dei figli degli aviatori (ONFA), for the assistance to sons and orphans of members of the Air Force;
 Italian Red Cross (CRI), for the training of personnel and acquisition of materials needed in order to ensure the organization of the CRI Military Voluntary Corps and Voluntary Nurses Corps of the Armed Forces;
 Lega navale italiana (LNI), for the assistance to members of the navy;
 Aero Club d'Italia (AECI), for the promotion and divulgation of the culture of flight and aviation in Italy. It is affiliated to CONI and overseen also by the Ministry of Infrastructure and Transport, Ministry of Economy and Finance, Presidency of the Council of Ministers and by the Ministry of the Interior.
 Unione italiana tiro a segno (UITS), an entity which promotes shooting sports and trains the armed personnel serving in public or private organizations;

Entities of Private Law 
The entities of private law entities overseen and funded by the Ministry are:

 Unione nazionale ufficiali in congedo in Italia (UNUCI), which provides assistance to retired army officers;
 Istituto "Andrea Doria", for the assistance to orphans of navy members;
 Opera Nazionale di Assistenza per gli Orfani ed i Militari di Carriera dell’Esercito, a moral entity which provides assistance to orphans of Officers, Petty officers, NCOs and soldiers with at least one year of seniority service and the oblation paid, who died in military service or are in a quiescence state.

Shareholdings 
 Difesa Servizi S.p.A. (100%), in-house company founded in 2010 in order to manage assets and services derived from the economic activities of the Ministry.

Palaces of Armed Forces

See also 
 Government of Italy
 Italian Armed Forces
 Italian Minister of Defence
 President of Italy

References

Bibliography

External links
 , official website
 , official English website

Defense
Italy
Military of Italy
1861 establishments in Italy
Italy